Morvalden Angerstoff Taylor (April 13, 1830 – May 31, 1925) was an American businessman and politician.

Taylor was born in Roxbury, Oxford County, Maine. He moved to Minnesota in 1855 and eventually settled in Melrose, Stearns County, Minnesota with his wife and family. He was a farmer and land surveyor. Taylor also served as the postmaster for Melrose, Minnesota. He served in the Minnesota House of Representatives in 1875.

References

1830 births
1925 deaths
People from Oxford County, Maine
People from Melrose, Minnesota
Farmers from Minnesota
Minnesota postmasters
Members of the Minnesota House of Representatives